Parveen Ashraf (born 22 June 1965) is a British food writer and TV chef of Indian cuisine.

{{Infobox person
| name               = Parveen Ashraf
| image              = Parveen Ashraf Portrait by Elizabeth Young Photography.jpg
| alt                = 
| birth_date         = 
| birth_place        = Bradford, West Yorkshire, England
| occupation         = Food writer, TV presenter, Newspaper columnist, author
| years_active       = 2008-Present
| television         = Parveen's Indian KitchenSaturday Morning with James MartinIdeal WorldHochanda
| spouse             = Qamar Ashraf (m. 1987)
| children           = 3
| website            = https://www.parveenthespicequeen.com/
}}

 Biography 
Ashraf was born in Bradford, West Yorkshire, England, and attended Carlton Bolling College. She spent most of her early career working in education eventually becoming an Ofsted inspector. Whilst working for Ofsted, Ashraf was diagnosed with a tumour and after a year of surgery she decided to leave her job and follow her passion of cooking. She went on to set up her own catering company and taught Indian cooking at adult colleges in East Anglia. In 2010, Ashraf developed her own range of recipes and spice kits to make authentic Indian food and became a regular guest presenter on TV shopping channels Ideal World and Hochanda. Ashraf appeared on the popular channel 4 show, Come Dine with Me, in 2009.

In 2016 her debut cookbook, Parveen The Spice Queen, Step by Step Authentic Indian Cooking was published and she began writing a weekly food column for the Peterborough Telegraph. Ashraf appeared as a guest presenter on Saturday Morning with James Martin in October 2018 showcasing some of her own dishes including 'Onion Bhaji Butty'. Following her success on TV, Ashraf presented Parveen's Indian Kitchen, a 10 part cooking series which aired on ITV in January 2019. The series was later broadcast in India, Norway, France, Australia, Sweden and Israel.

 Personal life 
Ashraf and her husband, Qamar, a civil engineer and property development manager, married in 1987 and have three children together. They live in Werrington Village, Peterborough. Ashraf is an ambassador for Action Medical Research and has also worked closely with The One Family Charity travelling to Nepal to help female victims of human trafficking and abuse.

 Filmography 
Television

 Bibliography 

 Parveen The Spice Queen, Step by Step Authentic Indian Cooking''  (2017, FCM Publishing)

References 

Living people
British chefs
British food writers
Indian cuisine in the United Kingdom
1965 births